Currarong is a small coastal fishing and tourist village of 556 houses in the Shoalhaven area of New South Wales, Australia. At the 2021 census, Currarong had a permanent population of 479 (occupying 38 percent of dwellings). The village is a haven for fishermen, with several underwater rises where fish are abundant.  As of 2021, there is a general store and take away cafe called Zac's Place, a licensed club, a caravan park, and many properties available for holiday rental.

Beaches

Currarong is surrounded by 14 white sand beaches, most notable are Warrain Beach and sheltered Abrahams Bosom beach. Currarong is also famous for its rock pool, the beaches and cliffs off the walking tracks around the Beecroft peninsula, and for the many protected beaches a few minutes drive away on the other side of the headland in Jervis Bay, including Long Beach, Cabbage Tree Beach and the perfectly horse-shoe shaped Honeymoon Bay.

Fishing and diving

Currarong has world class fishing - rock, beach and ocean. A spot down the cliff from Point Perpendicular is one of the few land based locations in Australia where Yellow Fin Tuna and Marlin can be caught. In 2011 a new boat ramp was completed that allows for launching two boats at a time. The area is also renowned for its scuba diving and snorkelling.

Sights

The wreck of the SS Merimbula is about 15 minutes walk. The freighter, belonging to the Illawarra Steam Navigation Company was wrecked on the Beecroft Headland in 1928.  All passengers and crew were rescued. The historic Point Perpendicular lighthouse is a 10-minute drive.

Currarong is one of the few places in NSW where you can sit on a North West facing beach looking at mountains across the water, and watch the sun set over the ocean.

Whales migrate along the coastline in season and dolphins cruise the waters of the bay every day.

In literature 
Currarong appears in Kylie Tennant's 1946 novel "Lost Haven".

References

Towns in New South Wales
Towns in the South Coast (New South Wales)
City of Shoalhaven
Fishing communities in Australia
Coastal towns in New South Wales